Mandirigma is a 2015 Philippine military drama film directed by Arlyn de la Cruz co-produced under Blank Pages Productions and Starquest Alliance.

Plot
Arlan Salcedo (Luis Alandy), a lieutenant in the Philippine Marine Corps gets promoted to captain after an operations in 2006. In 2014, he encounters the same group of enemies now armed with better equipment and training.

Cast
Luis Alandy as Capt. Arlan Salcedo
Mon Confiado as Hamda Marawan
Ping Medina
Alwin Uytingco
Victor Basa
Marc Solis
Carlo Cruz
Jericho Ejercito
 Ken Anderson
Alvin Fortuna
Roland Inocencio
Dennis Coronel

Production
Mandirigma is a co-production of Blank Pages Productions and Starquest Alliance with  Arlyn de la Cruz as its director. Work for the script for the film began in October 2014 and was finished by December of the same year. Filming took place at Camp Gregorio Lim in Cavite.

The film is centered around the Philippine Marine Corps. De la Cruz, a journalist himself, has covered the operations of the marines since the early 1990s and promised that the fighting depicted in the film will be "as close as possible to an actual battle". She is aided by a group of marines, most who are members of the Reconnaissance Force, as technical advisors.

The film is said to be inspired from the Mamasapano clash which involved the police's Special Action Force. This claim was denied by de la Cruz who pointed out that the script was finished prior to the incident. She added that the main antagonist of the film was Malaysian militant Zulkifli Abdhir, who is known for his alias Marwan and was involved in the certain operation.

Release
Mandirigma was premiered on December 17, 2015, as one of the New Wave entries of the 2015 Metro Manila Film Festival.

References

Films about marines
Films shot in Cavite
Philippine drama films
2015 drama films
2015 films